Oenopota pyramidalis, common name the pyramid lora, is a species of sea snail, a marine gastropod mollusk in the family Mangeliidae.

Description
The length of the shell varies between 10 mm and 23.5 mm.

The shell has usually a rather high spire with seven or eight tolerably convex whorls, scarcely or not at all shouldered. It shows 13 to 16 sigmoid ribs, fading out about or above the middle of the body whorl. There are numerous, fine, close revolving lines, sometimes not apparent on the ribs. The color of the shell is pale chestnut, when fresh. The species varies considerably in the elevation of the spire and in ther stoutness, as well as in the development of the ribs.

Distribution
This species occurs in European waters, the Northwest Atlantic Ocean, the Arctic waters of Canada, the Gulf of Maine. Fossils have been found in Quaternary strata of Iceland (age range: 0.126 to 0.012 Ma).

References

 
 Ström H. (1788). Beskrivelse over Norske Insecter, femte Styffe.. Nye Samling af det Kongelige Danske Videnskabers Selskabs Skrivter 3: 264–300
 Couthouy, J.P., 1839. Descriptions of new species of Mollusca and shells, and remarks on several polypi found in Massachusetts Bay. Boston J. nat. Hist. 2 : 53–111
 Möller H.P.C. (1842). Index Molluscorum Groenlandiae. Naturhistorisk Tidsskrift [Copenhagen] 4: 76–97
 Leche W. (1878). Öfversigt öfver de af svenska expeditionerna till Novaja Semlja och Jenissej 1875 och 1876 insamlade. Hafsmollusker. Kungliga Svenska Vetenskaps-Akademiens Handlingar, N.F., 16(2): 1–86, pl. 1–2
 Sars, G.O. (1878). Bidrag til Kundskaben om Norges arktiske Fauna. I. Mollusca Regionis Arcticae Norvegiae. Oversigt over de i Norges arktiske Region Forekommende Bløddyr. Brøgger, Christiania. xiii + 466 pp., pls 1–34 & I-XVIII
 Abbott, R.T. (1974). American Seashells. 2nd ed. Van Nostrand Reinhold: New York, NY (USA). 663 pp. 
 Linkletter, L.E. (1977) A checklist of marine fauna and flora of the Bay of Fundy. Huntsman Marine Laboratory, St. Andrews, N.B. 68 p. 
 Gofas, S.; Le Renard, J.; Bouchet, P. (2001). Mollusca, in: Costello, M.J. et al. (Ed.) (2001). European register of marine species: a check-list of the marine species in Europe and a bibliography of guides to their identification. Collection Patrimoines Naturels, 50: pp. 180–213.
 Trott, T.J. 2004. Cobscook Bay inventory: a historical checklist of marine invertebrates spanning 162 years. Northeastern Naturalist (Special Issue 2): 261–324

External links
 

pyramidalis
Gastropods described in 1788